Woughton is an area of south central Milton Keynes, Buckinghamshire, England. It takes its name from the original ecclesiastic parish of Woughton and its original village, Woughton on the Green.

For administrative purposes, the area is divided into two civil parishes: 
 Woughton (parish)
 Old Woughton parish (which contains the original village of Woughton on the Green).

See also
 Woughton Campus

Areas of Milton Keynes